Devi Lal Samar (30 July 1911 – 3 December 1981) was an Indian puppeteer who was the founder-director of a folk-theatre museum called the Bharatiya Lok Kala Mandal in Udaipur, Rajasthan. He was awarded Padma Shri for his outstanding work. He wrote several books in Hindi about Rajasthani theatre and puppetry.

Samar was a school teacher who learnt puppetry and in 1952 set up Bhartia Lok Kala Mandal. He also began the first puppet festival in 1954.

Devila Samar received the Padma Shri in 1968 for Katputli art. He died on 3 December 1981, at the age of 70.

See also
Devi Lal Samar the Visionary Behind The Bharatiya Lok Kala Mandal
Kathputli (Puppet)

References

Sources
puppetindia
ignca
kalamandal

1911 births
1981 deaths
Indian folklorists
Indian puppeteers
Indian theatre directors
Museum founders
People from Udaipur
Rajasthani culture
Rajasthani people
Recipients of the Padma Shri in arts